Thiruvalluvar Government Arts College, is a general degree college located in Rasipuram, Namakkal district, Tamil Nadu. It was established in the year 1968. The college is affiliated with Periyar University. This college offers different courses in arts, commerce and science.

Departments

Science
Physics
Chemistry
Mathematics
Statistics
Botany
Computer Science

Arts and Commerce
Tamil
English
History
Political Science
Public Administration
Economics
Commerce

Accreditation
The college is  recognized by the University Grants Commission (UGC).

References

External links

Educational institutions established in 1968
1968 establishments in Madras State
Colleges affiliated to Periyar University